Thado Minbya (also spelt as Thadominbya; 7 December 1345 –  3 September 1367) was the founder of the Kingdom of Ava. In his three plus years of reign (1364–67), the king laid the foundation for the reunification of Central Burma, which had been split into Pinya and Sagaing kingdoms since 1315. He also founded the capital city of Ava (Inwa) in 1365, which would remain the country's capital for most of the following five centuries. The young king restored order in central Burma, and tried to stamp out corrupt Buddhist clergy. He died of smallpox while on a southern military expedition in September 1367.

The 21-year-old king left no heirs. He was succeeded by his brother-in-law Swa Saw Ke.

Early life
Thado Minbya was born Rahula to Princess Soe Min Kodawgyi of Sagaing and Viceroy Thado Hsinhtein of Tagaung in 1345. From his mother's side, he was a grandson of King Saw Yun, the founder of the Sagaing Kingdom, and nephew of then reigning king Kyaswa as well as a great grandson of King Thihathu of Pinya and King Kyawswa of Pagan. From his father's side, he was descended from a line of hereditary rulers of Tagaung from the House of Thado. According to British colonial period scholarship, his father was an ethnic Shan and his mother was mostly Shan; however some have argued that no extant chronicle or archaeological evidence supports the conjecture. The prince had two younger sisters: Shin Saw Gyi and Saw Omma. His father died soon after the birth of Saw Omma. His mother remarried to Thihapate, a grandnephew of Queen Pwa Saw of Pagan. In 1352, Thihapate became king of Sagaing.

Prince Rahula grew up in Sagaing during the small kingdoms period of Myanmar (Burma). The country had disintegrated into several small kingdoms since the fall of Pagan Empire in 1287. Central Burma itself had been split into two rival kingdoms, Sagaing and Pinya, and ruled by two rival branches of the House of Myinsaing since 1315. Sagaing ruled north and west of the Irrawaddy while Pinya ruled south and east of the main artery. The two states were never too strong to begin with but starting in 1359, they began to face a serious existential threat in the form of massive raids from the northern Shan State of Maw. In response, King Thihapate appointed his 15-year-old stepson governor of Tagaung, the northernmost territory, 200 km north of Sagaing, with the title of Thado Minbya. The king reasoned that it was a suitable appointment as Thado Minbya's father had been the hereditary ruler of the garrison town.

Governor of Tagaung
At Tagaung, the teenage prince could do little to stem the raids. According to a contemporary inscription, the raiders penetrated as far south as Pinya in 1362–63. They came again in the following dry season, this time determined to take both Tagaung and Sagaing. It was part of the agreement between the Maw sawbwa Tho-Chi-Bwa and King Narathu of Pinya to jointly dismember Sagaing. Thado Minbya led the defense of Tagaung but due to a great disparity in manpower as well as cavalry and elephants, the fort fell. Thado Minbya barely escaped, arriving at Sagaing on a single war elephant.

Thado Minbya found no reprieve at Sagaing. He was promptly sent to prison by Thihapate for having lost Tagaung. The young prince had argued that the king needed his help in defending Sagaing itself but to no avail. He was imprisoned at Kya-Khat-Wa-Ya, a town on the Irrawaddy south of Sagaing. As expected, the Maw forces came down, and laid siege to Sagaing on three sides. (Pinya forces were supposed to blockade Sagaing's port but failed to do so.) After a few months, in April 1364, the invaders broke through and overran the capital. Thihapate and his personal guards escaped, and sailed down to Kya-Khat-Wa-Ya. By then, Thado Minbya had escaped and was waiting for his stepfather. The prince had the king executed, and declared himself king, in May 1364.

Reign

Founding of Ava
Thado Minbya was a mere one of the several "kings" who had declared themselves independent in the wake of the devastating invasion. The Maw forces had looted and pillaged central Burma but returned as the rainy season arrived, carrying off King Narathu of Pinya and leaving central Burma in a power vacuum. Pinya's new ruler Uzana II had little control beyond the capital; Pinya's southern vassals—Pagan, Sagu, Taungdwin, Prome and Toungoo—were in open revolt. Over at Sagaing, Thado Minbya managed to win over the Sagaing court, and reassembled Sagaing's military forces in the next two months. His cross-river rival Uzana II could not do the same. In August/September, he crossed the Irrawaddy with a sizable force, and seized Pinya. He ordered the execution of Uzana II, and declared himself king of Pinya while raising Saw Omma of Pinya, the chief queen of the last three Pinya kings, as his chief consort.

Despite his proclamation, the 18-year-old still had no control over Pinya's southern vassals. It is not clear how much control he had over Sagaing's vassals in the north either. Indeed, his first priority was to defend his realm as the threat of annual dry-season raids from the north still loomed. In the next six months, he feverishly built a new citadel at a more strategic location at the confluence of the Irrawaddy and the Myitnge. It was directly across the Irrawaddy from Sagaing, roughly between Sagaing and Pinya and right by the all important Kyaukse granary. It was the very site that his great grandfather Thihathu initially had wanted to build a new capital before choosing to build at Pinya in 1313. He drained the swamps around the site, and built a new fortified capital. He also gained a much needed respite as Maw Shan raids did not come down that dry season. The initial phase of the capital was completed in about six months. The fortified city was on an island surrounded by rivers and moats. So strategic was the location that Ava would be the capital of successive Burmese kingdoms for the most of next five centuries. On 26 February 1365, the king proclaimed the foundation of the city of Ava (Inwa), as the capital of the successor state of Pinya and Sagaing Kingdoms. The city's brick walls were completed on 6 July 1365.

Reunification of Central Burma
Thado Minbya would spend the rest of his reign trying to consolidate all of Central Burma under his rule. In early 1365, his realm was still largely in the north, and controlled little south of Ava beyond the Kyaukse region. Pagan (160 km southwest of Ava), Sagu (220 km southwest), Taungdwin (240 km south), Nganwegon (280 km south), Toungoo (350 km southeast) and Prome (400 km south) all remained de facto or de jure independent. (Toungoo had been in revolt since 1358.) However, he did have some advantages: he controlled Kyaukse and Mu regions, two of the three main granaries of Upper Burma; and he had the support of key experienced leaders like Gov. Thilawa of Yamethin and Gov. Swa Saw Ke of Amyint.

His reunification campaign began at the start of the rainy season of 1365. His decision was likely due to the threat of dry season raids by the Maw Shans. His target was Sagu, capital of Minbu District, the third key granary of Upper Burma. En route to Sagu, he took Pagan, the former royal capital, without a fight, by 8 July 1365. But he could not take a heavily fortified Sagu despite his repeated attempts. He finally had to retreat as he received news that a Toungoo army led by Baya Kyawthu of Nganwegon was raiding the Kyaukse region. Realizing that Toungoo was not about to reunify Central Burma, Thado Minbya marched to Nganwegon (present-day Pyinmana–Naypyidaw), a vassal state of Toungoo, in the following dry season of 1365–66. When the army finally took the town, he killed Baya Kyawthu himself, and ate a meal on the corpse's chest—an act that horrified even his most seasoned staff.

Nonetheless, he did not invade further south towards Toungoo. The ever present threat of Maw Shan raids from the north factored into his strategy. He needed to keep his dry season campaigns short. (Maw raids into deep Central Burma would continue until 1368.) In the dry season of 1366–67, he tried to pick off Taungdwin, west of his newly acquired territory of Nganwegon. The conquest of Taungdwin would allow him to isolate Sagu to the west as well as fortify his hold of Nganwegon to the east. When his army could not break the walls of Taungdwin, he sent his newly acquired commander Nga Tet Pya to penetrate inside the fort, and had the key Taungdwin commander assassinated. Tet Pya did his job, and Thihapate, ruler of Taungdwin, submitted shortly after.

In 1367, he decided to take on Sagu once more. His decision was certainly made easier by the death of Theingaba, the ruler of Toungoo, on 29 March 1367. He again marched to Sagu in the rainy season, and laid siege to the city. In early September, the king was seized with smallpox, and had to retreat. But it was too late. He died shortly after  3 September 1367 at Swegyo near Pagan.

Taking on corrupt clergy
By the time Thado Minbya came to power, a large percentage of the Buddhist clergy had become corrupt, and the new king was determined to stamp it out. When a monk misappropriated some gold that a poor widow had left in his monastery for safekeeping during one of the Shan raids, the king denounced the monk in the audience chamber of the palace, cut off the monk's head with his own hands, made a hole in the floor with his sword, and kicked the corpse down the opening. The barbaric act had the desired effect on the clergy. Nevertheless, he extended full patronage to orthodox monks and encouraged learning among both monks and laymen.

Nga Tet Pya episode
The young king was magnanimous even to those who opposed him. For example, when Nga Tet Pya, a popular bandit who robbed the rich and shared his loot with the poor, was captured, the king in full audience asked him:
Scoundrel, your punishment can only be death but because you shared your loot with the poor, I will give you this favor. What do you choose, the sword or trampling by elephants?

The bandit replied:
I choose your prettiest queen, Saw Omma.

The king, instead of being insulted by the reply said:
You're a brave man. I spare your life. You may go free.

Tet Pya was so overcome by the king's graciousness that he entered the royal service, and became the king's most distinguished commanders.

Succession struggle
The 21-year-old king left no heirs. His "most beautiful" queen Saw Omma nearly succeeded in seizing the throne with Nga Nu, commander of the Inner Household Guards. Chronicles say that Nga Nu won over the queen by saying that he had come to kill the queen on Thado Minbya's orders because the king did not want her to be taken by another man. Saw Omma is said to have asked: "Nga Nu, aren't you a man?" The duo then decided to seize the throne. Nga Nu's men killed off the palace guards and maids, who did not agree with the plan. Ultimately they decided to leave for Sagaing, across the Irrawaddy from Ava. There, the couple proclaimed themselves king and queen of Sagaing, hoping to revive the old Sagaing Kingdom.

But ministers intervened and first gave the throne to Gov. Thilawa of Yamethin. However, Thilawa refused the offer, and suggested Swa Saw Ke, brother-in-law of both Thado Minbya and Thilawa, and brother of Saw Omma. Swa, a prince of both Myinsaing and Pagan heritage, accepted the offer, and became king on 5 September 1367.

Chronicle reporting differences
The royal chronicles do not necessarily agree on his birth, death and reign dates.

Ancestry

Notes

References

Bibliography
 
 
 
 
 
 
 
 
 
 
 
 
 

Sagaing dynasty
Pinya dynasty
Ava dynasty
1367 deaths
1345 births
Deaths from smallpox
14th-century Burmese monarchs